The Panasonic Lumix DMC-G2 is a digital mirrorless interchangeable lens camera adhering to the Olympus and Panasonic developed Micro Four Thirds System (MFT) system design standard. It was announced in March 2010 along with a lesser featured Panasonic Lumix DMC-G10.

Introduced as successor to the Panasonic Lumix DMC-G1, the G2 included 720p HD video capability using both AVCHD Lite and Motion JPEG recording formats.

The G2 has a resistive touchscreen to control many camera functions including easy selection of a focus point within the live view frame.  The touchscreen interface allows control duplicating the numerous dials and buttons on the G2.  The G2 shipped with a new Panasonic 14–42 mm kit zoom lens, a lighter, and less expensive, version of the original Panasonic 14–45 mm kit zoom sold that shipped with the Panasonic G1.

The United States MSRP with 14–42 mm kit zoom lens was US$800.00. Available colors were black, red and blue.

The Micro Four Thirds system 
The Micro Four Thirds (MFT) system design standard was jointly announced in 2008 by Olympus and Panasonic, as a further evolution of the similarly named predecessor Four Thirds System pioneered by Olympus.  The Micro Four Thirds system standard uses the same sized sensor (nominal 4000 pixels by 3000 pixels) as the original Four Thirds system. One potential advantage of the smaller MFT system sensor (when compared to market leaders Canon and Nikon APS-C and full frame sized) is potentially smaller and lighter lenses.  The smaller MFT sensor with reduced image circle allows the development of smaller and lighter native lenses.  The MFT sensor has a crop factor of 2.0 when compared to 35mm film equivalent full frame sensors.  By comparison, the more popular consumer (as opposed to professional) DSLRs such as those made by Canon, Nikon and Sony have 1.5 to 1.6 crop factor APS-C sensors, which means larger and heavier lens designs.  For example, a typical Olympus MFT M.Zuiko 14-42mm f/3.5-5.6 kit lens weighs 112g, is 56mm in diameter and 50mm in length.  The equivalent Canon APS-C DSLR EF-S 18-55mm f3.5–5.6 kit lens weighs 190g, and is 69mm in diameter and 80mm in length

While the older Four Thirds system design standard allowed the incorporation of a single lens reflex (SLR) camera design including a mirror box and pentaprism based optical viewfinder system, the MFT system design standard sought to pursue a technically different camera, and specifically slimmed down the key physical specifications which eliminated the ability to include the traditional complex optical path and the bulky mirror box needed for a SLR optical viewfinder.  Instead, MFT uses either a built-in (Panasonic) or optional (Olympus/Panasonic) compact electronic viewfinder (EVF) and/or LCD back panel displaying a Live view from the main image sensor.  Use of an EVF/back panel LCD and smaller four thirds image sensor format and allows for smaller and lighter camera bodies and lenses. The MFT system standard also specifically includes seamless switching between still photography and HD video recording as a design criterion.

MFT cameras are physically slimmer than most interchangeable lens cameras because the standard specifies a much reduced lens mount flange to imaging sensor plane distance of just 20mm.  Typically this so-called flange focal distance is over 40mm on most interchangeable lens cameras. The MFT system design flange focal length distance allows for, through use of an adapter, the possibility to mount virtually any manufacturer's existing and legacy still camera interchangeable lens (as well as some video and cine lenses) to an MFT body, albeit using manual focus and manual aperture control.  For example, many theoretically obsolete 35mm film camera lenses, as well as existing current lenses for APS-C and full frame DSLR's are now usable on MFT cameras.  As an example, an older (i.e., used, obsolete and low priced), but still high quality, 50mm f/1.8 "standard" lens from a 35mm film camera can be used on a MFT camera body.  With MFT sensors having a crop factor of 2.0, the old 50mm f/1.8 "standard" lens becomes a high-speed (although manual) 100mm f/1.8 telephoto portrait lens.  So, the MFT system allows the re-use of expensive lenses that may have outlived their 35mm film format camera, and can be used on a modern digital camera body capable of both still and HD video recording.  Similarly, the MFT system design allows current DSLR lenses to be used as well, although only with manual focus and aperture control.

Panasonic Lumix DMC-G2 features 
Upon introduction in March 2010, the Panasonic Lumix DMC-G2 was marketed as the world's first interchangeable lens camera with an articulated, touch control LCD. Also added was 720p HD video and a redesigned physical user interface, changing placement of dials and button controllers, and an electronic viewfinder. Notably, the G2 was not capable of full 1080p HD video as was the then top-of-the-line Panasonic GH1. The ability to choose the focus point by touching the desired area on the screen was implemented in all Panasonic MFT cameras introduced after the G2. Other manufacturers such as Sony with its new NEX family of cameras, and Olympus in its PEN E-P3 MFT camera also incorporated use of the touch screen feature for camera controls.

The "new" 14-42mm kit zoom lens was less expensive than the original optical image stabilized 14-45mm f/3.5-5.6 kit zoom lens that came with the G1.  The 14-42mm kit lens is lighter, but longer than the original 14-45mm kit lens, features a plastic, rather than metal lens mount, and omits on-off switch for the in lens optical image stabilization system.  However, the 14-42mm optical image stabilization system on-off could be controlled through camera menus.  Many enthusiasts regard the 14-42mm kit lens as a step down in both optical image quality and build quality from the original 14-45mm kit lens.

Body colors and MSRP 
The camera was available in three colors — black (suffix K), red (R) and blue (B). MSRP in the United States for the body and 14-42mm kit zoom lens was $USD 800.00.

Successor model 
The G2 camera's successor model is the Panasonic Lumix DMC-G3 which was announced in May 2011.

Video recording formats

AVCHD Lite Format (.MTS files)

M-JPEG Format (.MOV files)

References

External links

 Panasonic Lumix DMC-G2 site
 Panasonic Lumix DMC-G2 Press Release
 Lumix DMC-G2 Review by dpreview.com
 Lumix DMC-G2 Review by imaging-resource.com
 Information & Tutorials on the Lumix DMC-G2 at TheG2Club.com

GH1